The Star Awards for Best Drama Serial is an award presented annually at the Star Awards, a ceremony that was established in 1994.

The category was only introduced in 1996, at the 3rd Star Awards ceremony; Tofu Street received the award and it is given in honour of a Mediacorp drama serial which has delivered an outstanding overall performance. The nominees are determined by a team of judges employed by Mediacorp; winners are selected by a majority vote from the entire judging panel.

Since its inception, the award has been given to 25 drama serials. My Star Bride was the most recent winner in this category. My Star Bride was the most recent winner in this category. Since the ceremony held in 2016, The Dream Makers is also the only drama serial to win in this category twice. In addition, C.L.I.F. has been nominated on four occasions, more than any other drama serial. It also holds the record for the most nominations without a win.

Winners and nominees

Multiple wins and nominations

The following dramas received two or more Best Drama Serial awards: 

The following dramas received two or more Best Drama nominations:

References

External links 

Star Awards